Lucifer of Siena (3rd century – 4th century), was the first bishop of Siena.  He was appointed in 306, two years after the death of Saint Ansano.

See also

References

200s births
Year of birth unknown
300s deaths
Year of death unknown
Place of death unknown
Bishops of Siena